The Best of Master P is a compilation album released by Priority Records containing the greatest hits of rapper, Master P. It was released on October 4, 2005 and peaked at #61 on the Top R&B/Hip-Hop Albums. On the same day, several related compilations were released, The Best of C-Murder, The Best of Silkk the Shocker and The Best of TRU.

Track listing

References 

2005 compilation albums
Master P albums
Priority Records compilation albums
Gangsta rap compilation albums